Wacholz is a surname. Notable people with the surname include:

 Kevin Wacholz (born 1958), American retired professional wrestler 
 Leon Wacholz (1867–1942), Polish scientist and medical examiner 
 Steve "Doc" Wacholz (born 1962), American heavy metal drummer

See also 
 8501 Wachholz

Surnames